Géo Voumard (2 December 1920 – 3 September 2008) was a Swiss jazz pianist and composer. He was a co-founder of the Montreux Jazz Festival and composer of the song "Refrain" which won the first Eurovision Song Contest.

Life and career 
Voumard was born in Biel/Bienne. He originally studied architecture in college before starting his musical career.

Music career 
Voumard joined the Hazy Osterwald Orchestra in 1944. Four years later, in 1948, he created his own group. Voumard began broadcasting out of Radio Lausanne, which is now known as Radio Suisse Romande, in 1952. He originally joined Radio Lausanne as an accompanist, pianist, composer and musical producer. In 1966, Voumard became the station's director of pop music. He later served as Radio Lausanne's director of light entertainment from 1969 until 1983.

Voumard founded the Montreux Jazz Festival with René Langel and Claude Nobs in 1967. He co-wrote the very first Eurovision Song Contest winning song, Refrain in 1956. Refrain was co-written by Émile Gardaz.

Voumard moved to the Provence region of France following his departure from radio broadcasting in the 1980s. He worked as an architect in France before returning to his native Switzerland for the remainder of his life.

Géo Voumard died at the age of 87.

Discography 
 Flavio Ambrosetti Sextet, 1943
 Geo Voumard Trio With Mers Eddy And His Strings – Piano, Strings And Sound
 Géo Voumard – 25 Ans De Jazz, 1953–1977
 Géo Voumard Trio – Geo Voumard Trio
 Hazy Osterwald – Big Bands of Europe Vol. Ii, 1946–1948
 Various – The Golden Swing Years, 1942–1947

References 

1920 births
2008 deaths
People from Biel/Bienne
Swiss jazz pianists
Swiss composers
Swiss male composers
Swiss songwriters
Swiss architects
Eurovision Song Contest winners
20th-century pianists
Male pianists
20th-century male musicians
Male jazz musicians